Polly-Louisa Salmon (born 19 July 1990), better known by her stage name GFOTY, an abbreviation of Girlfriend of the Year, is a British pop singer. From 2013 to 2018, she released music through the PC Music label. She now independently releases her music.  Much of her work has been in the form of mini-mixes.

Biography
GFOTY is the daughter of art dealer Jeff Salmon. She grew up in London, England and ran a blog. Her earliest songs include "Take a Picture", which includes rap group Serious Thugs, and "Friday Night", which is a darkly-comical take on pop clichés about partying teenagers. A remix of the latter has since been incorporated into producer Sophie's sets.

Her debut single, "Bobby", was released in 2013 via the PC Music record label and collective. It describes feelings of futility after a breakup. GFOTY uses a spoken word delivery over a tense, synthesised wall of sound. She released Secret Mix in March 2014. It includes cover versions of songs by Celine Dion, Toni Braxton, and Carly Simon. Tiny Mix Tapes named Secret Mix the third best music release of 2014. She also appeared on PC Music's mix for DIS Magazine DISown. Focusing on the relationship between art and commerce, her contribution includes conspicuous product placement for Red Bull. One of the songs from her mix became her second single "Don't Wanna / Let's Do It". It creates an uneasy mood by taking two conflicting phrases and frantically sampling them.

GFOTY contributed vocals to "Hard", the B-side to Sophie's "Lemonade" single. In September 2014, producer Ryan Hemsworth released the compilation EP shh#ffb6c1 on his pseudo-label Secret Songs, which included a GFOTY-featured track named "My Song". Shortly after, she collaborated with PC Music artist Maxo on "Not That Bad".

For Halloween in 2014, GFOTY appeared alongside fellow label artists including A. G. Cook and Danny L Harle for a single, special live Halloween webcast named Dead or Alive. All of the PC Music artists appeared in the webcast, portraying spooky alter egos of themselves. GFOTY's persona was "Ghoulfriend of the Year". The show was broadcast in the UK, USA, Denmark and Japan.

In 2015 GFOTY released a mix titled Cake Mix. It is composed of bright, saccharine songs interspersed with buzzing, glitchy breakdowns. The mix includes an adaptation of Peter Andre's 1996 single "Mysterious Girl" featuring Bubbler Ranx and a cover of Blink-182's 2000 single "All the Small Things". In March 2015,  a mix titled Dog Food Mix 1 with PC Music artist Spinee was released, as a reworking of GFOTY's earlier songs. A second mix, Dog Food Mix 2, was released in May 2015.

March 2015 saw GFOTY head to the USA to play the PC Music showcase at the Empire Garage in Austin, Texas as part of SXSW. Her performance was well received, with Exclaim! writing that it was a "fascinating set"  and Noisey saying "Here's what I did when I saw GFOTY, which was probably the best thing I've seen all week: I fucking lost my mind. I loved it. I was ecstatic." On 8 May 2015, GFOTY performed as part of a PC Music show at BRIC House in Brooklyn, New York as part of the Red Bull Music Academy Festival. The show was billed as the premiere of Pop Cube, "a multimedia reality network".

On 25 October 2016, GFOTY released a glitch pop-influenced pop rock EP titled Call Him A Doctor, which is presumed to be a continuation of her previous EP, VIPOTY.

On 9 November 2017, the single "Tongue" was released with an accompanying joint music video for "Tongue" and the VIPOTY track "Poison". "Tongue" is a single from her "greatest hits" compilation called GFOTYBUCKS - which contains 19 tracks from VIPOTY, Call Him A Doctor, past mixes, and various singles - was released on 17 November 2017. On the same date, a "32 page magazine created by GFOTY with exclusive GFOTYBUCKS recipes, lyrics and artwork by various GFOTY approved artists" is available to buy as a bundle with the GFOTYBUCKS CD.

On 14 December 2018, GFOTY confirmed that she had left the PC Music label to become an indie artist. She released her single "Boy Next Door" under her own label "GIRLFRIEND RECORDS." Via Twitter, she announced that she will be releasing her new EP If You Think I'm A Bitch You Should Meet GFOTY in March 2019.

Artistry

Music

GFOTY's music favours tense, bouncy beats with pounding drums. Her style of sing-speaking gives her a more coarse, human quality compared to the rest of the PC Music roster. Describing her singing as "child like", GFOTY often manipulates her words by twisting an individual syllable. Her spoken word vocals are supported by distorted, high-pitched backing vocals. GFOTY's more sentimental songs are offshoots of bittersweet power ballads by singers like Celine Dion and Toni Braxton. She has cited R. Kelly as an influence, calling him "either the most clever guy in the universe or a complete moron, and I love that I can't figure it out."

Public image
GFOTY has been characterised as "the most obviously political" act on the PC Music label. Her persona is animated and loudmouthed, as a lampoon of club culture. GFOTY's comments regarding race have been criticised, with Noisey removing some of her remarks from its site. She has likened herself to a female version of The Game: Penetrating the Secret Society of Pickup Artists. GFOTY's lyrics detail nights of drinking and casual sex. Sporting a sweatsuit for her live performances, she describes her fashion as "a pink onesie covered in Swarovski crystals with loads of money coming out the pockets and Ugg boots". GFOTY uses an exaggeratedly feminine style similar to the cute aesthetic of her contemporaries. However, this is often used to conceal a more sinister element, and she has commented that she doesn't "particularly think gfoty  is cute".

With low-quality selfies, photo manipulation, and the use of wigs, GFOTY shrouds her image and identity. Her facetious interviews with press often blur the line between her real life and the GFOTY character. She characterised GFOTY as "a state of mind which can only be achieved by the deepest level of meditation on a beach in Barbados surrounded by cute jetski instructors." GFOTY often discusses having trained as a chef and baking desserts. She maintains an Instagram profile of inspirational quotes.

Discography

Studio albums

Mini-albums

Compilation albums

Extended plays

Mixes

Singles

Featured singles

Other appearances

Music videos

References

External links
 
 

1990 births
Living people
Musicians from London
PC Music artists
Place of birth missing (living people)
English women pop singers
English people of Greek descent
English Jews
Jewish English musicians
Jewish singers
21st-century English women singers
21st-century English singers